Abraham Conlon is an American chef and a native of Lowell, Massachusetts, of Portuguese heritage.  Conlon is the winner of the 2018 James Beard Foundation Award for Best Chef: Great Lakes.

Education 
At the early age of 15, Conlon showed interest in cooking and gained knowledge of classic sensibilities.

He studied classical training at the Culinary Institute of America with mentors Franc Giovanini and Jon Matheison.

He studied fusion techniques under Norman Van Aken.

Career 
Conlon ran Chez Asian Bistro, a restaurant with a blend of Southeast Asian styles with local ingredients, in Santo Domingo, Dominican Republic.

He became the youngest chef to win the AAA 4 Diamond Award for Augustine’s at Fredericksburg Square in Virginia.

Conlon and his business partner, Adrienne Lo, founded X-marx, an underground supper club in Chicago that served seven to 12 courses, three to four times per week, without repeating dishes and no repetition of a dish to serve.

In November 2012, Conlon and Lo opened their own fine-dining restaurant, Fat Rice, named after the home-style arroz gordo in Logan Square, Chicago. Conlon is the Head Chef of Fat Rice.

Awards 

 James Beard Foundation Award 2018 – Best Chef: Great Lakes
 StarChefs: “Rising Star” 2015
 Four Diamond Award by AAA
 Nominated in 2017 for a James Beard Award for Excellence in Cuisine

Published Book 

 The Adventures of Fat Rice: Recipes from the Chicago Restaurant Inspired by Macau (Ten Speed Press)

References 

Living people
Culinary Institute of America alumni
Chefs from Chicago
American male chefs
American restaurateurs
Year of birth missing (living people)